MotoGP 3 may refer to:

 MotoGP 3 (2003 video game), a 2003 video game published by Namco
 MotoGP 3: Ultimate Racing Technology, a 2005 video game published by THQ
 Moto3 (250cc) Grand Prix motorcycle racing series using 0.25L engines

See also
 MotoGP (disambiguation)